Morse is an unincorporated community in Section 9, Graham Township, Johnson County, Iowa, United States. It is a part of the Iowa City Metropolitan Statistical Area.

History
Morse was founded in 1871. The first settler was William Jayne. One of the founders was A.W.G. Morse, an early settler in Iowa, who kept journals which have been recently published by Cedar Creek Press. It was once a stop on the Burlington, Cedar Rapids and Northern Railway, later part of the CRI&P.

Morse's population was 91 in 1925.

It contains several houses and the Morse Community Club.

Every year the community hosts a 3 July celebration, which includes a parade, food, and fireworks.

Notes

Unincorporated communities in Johnson County, Iowa
Unincorporated communities in Iowa
Iowa City metropolitan area
1871 establishments in Iowa